Nottingham City Transport (NCT) is the major bus operator of the city of Nottingham, England. NCT operates extensively within Nottingham as well beyond the city boundaries into Nottinghamshire county. Publicly-owned, it is today the second largest municipal bus company in the United Kingdom after Lothian Buses in Edinburgh, Scotland.

History 

Horse-drawn buses operated in Nottingham from 1848. The Nottingham and District Tramways Company Limited opened its first routes in 1878 with horse-drawn trams, and experimented with steam traction a few years later. The company was taken over by Nottingham Corporation Tramways in 1898. Electrification followed, with the first electric trams operating in January 1901 and within two years over 100 trams were in service on eight lines. The first motorbuses were introduced in 1906.

The Nottingham trolleybus system was inaugurated in 1927. By 1930 a number of routes had been converted from trams to trolleybuses. A new bus depot was opened on Parliament Street in June 1929 and is still in use today.

By 1935 the trolleybus fleet had reached its peak at 106 vehicles, making it the largest fleet in the country. The last tram ran in September 1936. World War II brought reduced services, economy measures (including diluting diesel with creosote) and blackout screens on vehicles. Before the war some diesel-engined buses were introduced, although large scale deliveries of buses did not take place until after the war. The advent of diesel services enabled the last petrol-engined buses to be withdrawn.

By the end of the 1950s, trolleybuses were in decline, the last new trolleybus joining the fleet in 1952 reaching a maximum fleet of 155 vehicles. The first one-man operated bus appeared in 1951. Trolleybuses were withdrawn between April 1965 and July 1966, and the West Bridgford UDC Transport undertaking came under Nottingham's control in 1968. One-man operation started to come into force in January 1970 and by 1977 nearly all services were one-man operated. In 1974 it was renamed City of Nottingham Transport and by 1976 an all-time peak of 494 operated vehicles was reached.

To comply with the Transport Act 1985, in 1986 the assets were transferred to a new legal entity. However the company effectively remained in public ownership as Nottingham City Council held full equity of the new entity. In 1988 Stevenson's Bus Services, Ilkeston was purchased and formed a subsidiary company. Erewash Valley Services Limited. These services were integrated with the main company in 1990.

In 1991 South Notts Bus Company was purchased for £1, giving NCT a route from Nottingham to Loughborough and a garage at Gotham. In 1997 Pathfinder (Newark) Limited was purchased, giving NCT a presence in the north of the county. Fleet names are retained within the company but both South Notts and Pathfinder liveries are now extinct, although routes into Clifton and into South Nottinghamshire have navy line branding, taken from the navy blue livery of South Notts.

Despite many offers to buy, Nottingham City Council retained 100% ownership in NCT until May 2001, when 5% of the shares were issued to Transdev. This was related to the Nottingham Express Transit operating contract being awarded to Arrow Light Rail, a consortium between Transdev (later Veolia Transdev), Nottingham City Transport, Bombardier, Carillion, Galaxy and Innisfree. The consortium was contracted to build and operate the light rail for 30.5 years since 9 March 2004, but the contract was ripped up in 2011 when Tramlink Nottingham was selected as the preferred bidder for the construction of Phase 2 of the light rail. The last day of operations of Arrow Light Rail was 16 December 2011.

Another change early in the 2000s was the introduction of 'Go2' and 'Network'. This was a concept whereby every bus route was assigned a colour, and all the routes exiting the city via the same route (or went in the same general direction) had the same colour (e.g. every route using Derby Road to leave the city were coloured orange). This led to the coloured lines system which is still in use. Go2 buses had a colour coded front with white rear, and Network buses had a colour coded area round the front windows and a stripe to the back, on a two-tone dark green base. Buses with no colour coding (used when a correctly coloured one is not available) were plain green or white. The livery went through a change about 10 years after the start of the colour system where Go2 had colour coding on both ends of the bus with a silver centre, and Network the same but with a green centre. The Network brand started to fade away in 2015 as these buses also began having silver centres, and the Network name dropped when a bus was repainted.

Ecolink ethanol buses 

In 2007, Nottingham City Transport became the first company in the UK to introduce Ethanol powered "Eco" buses. Named "Ecolink 30", the service used a combination of standard diesel powered Scania OmniCity buses and 3 specially converted ethanol Scania OmniLink buses on its Pink Line 30 route.

The ethanol powered buses were painted in a special "Ecolink" livery which used flowers and leaves along the side of the bus to symbolise the "green-ness" of the buses. They also used the slogan "Go Green", combined with the information that they reduced CO2 emissions by around 30 tonnes.

The ethanol buses were equipped with a colour LED destination display, an LCD screen onboard which allowed advertisements &/or CCTV footage to be played, a Star Trak GPS locating system which allowed for real time ETA's to be displayed at electronic bus stop timetable displays and also allowed for the next stop to be displayed on the buses onboard electronic display (Above the "Bus Stopping" sign). The buses also had a low floor to allow for wheelchair/buggy access and were equipped with an extendable ramp to allow wheelchair users to board the bus when there is a gap between the bus door and the pavement.

The buses were purchased by Nottingham City Council using funding from the East Midlands Development Agency which allowed them to purchase three ethanol powered buses and construct an ethanol fuelling station. The buses are operated and maintained by Nottingham City Transport.

This trial ended in March 2013, when it was no longer viable to source ethanol. The three buses were converted to diesel and were branded for the Pathfinder service to Southwell. They were re-branded again later in a generic silver livery, to be used on any route. 
To replace them, three standard Scania OmniCity vehicles from another route were refurbished, and repainted in to green 'Nottingham Network' livery with pink ends to denote the service being part of the pink line. The said formerly ethanol-powered buses were sold in 2019 following the purchase of new Alexander- Dennis Enviro200 MMCs.

Fleet 

As of August 2020, the fleet consisted of 310 buses, including several training buses.
In 2017, Nottingham City Transport won funding from the Office of Low-Emission Vehicles to purchase a fleet of 53 biogas-powered Alexander-Dennis Enviro400 City double decker buses, which were rolled out over 2017 and 2018. By 2018, Nottingham City Transport were running the largest fleet of biogas-powered buses in the world.

In 2019, Nottingham City Transport again successfully bidded for funding from the OLEV to expand the gas refuelling station at its Parliament Street depot, and ordered 67 more gas buses, more than doubling the fleet. One of these was a demonstrator previously in service with National Express West Midlands.

In February 2022, Nottingham City Transport announced that they were ordering 23 more gas buses, which are due in the spring of 2022, bringing the total number of gas buses to 143. (This is partially due to the restructuring of some route-branding of buses that took place in February.) The operator also announced that they and Nottingham City Council had submitted a business case as part of a bid to the UK government's Zero Emission Bus Regional Areas (ZEBRA) Fund for funding the purchase of 78 electric single-decker buses, and the following month they announced that their bid had been successful. The new electric buses, which will replace Nottingham City Transport's entire single-decker fleet, are expected to be introduced between 2023 and 2024; the first 12 of these will be Yutong E12s, with tenders for the remaining 66 buses to be announced in 2023.

Depots 
NCT operate two depots in Parliament Street, and Trent Bridge.

Milestones 
Nottingham City Transport have introduced many new bus models and transport concepts over the years, including:
Converting the first Scania OmniCity for right-hand drive operation
Converting the first Scania OmniLink for right-hand drive operation
Introduction of EasyRider contactless smartcard, the first in the UK
Introduction of Ethanol powered Scania OmniLink buses (First in the UK)
First Genuine batch of Scania OmniTown buses
First full height Alexander Dennis Enviro 400 Scanias in the UK
First Biogas Alexander Dennis Enviro 400 CBG City.
World's largest fleet of gas-powered buses.
First company to win UK Bus Operator of the Year award 5 times.

Competitors 

Stagecoach in Mansfield also serve Nottingham, operating the Pronto service (formerly in partnership with TrentBarton) between Chesterfield, Mansfield and Nottingham, and Stagecoach in Worksop operate the Sherwood Arrow to Worksop via Ollerton, Edwinstowe and White Post Farm. These services both compete with NCT between the Victoria Bus Station and the Redhill area of Nottingham.

YourBus competed directly against NCT with their routes Y28 and Y36 on GO2 Pink 28 to Bilborough and GO2 Orange 36 route to Beeston and Chilwell. However, in August 2016 the Y28 route ceased operation, and at the same time the Y36 stopped serving Chilwell, and therefore only served between Beeston and Nottingham City Centre and in November 2016 the Y36 was cut further with last buses operating between 6PM and 7PM. The Y36 service ceased operating completely with its last day on 11 February 2017. The Yourbus operation ceased permanently on Friday, 4 October 2019.

TrentBarton is also competitor operating services across the East Midlands.

See also 
List of bus operators of the United Kingdom

References

External links 

Nottingham City Transport official website

Bus operators in Nottinghamshire
Companies based in Nottinghamshire
Companies owned by municipalities of England
Transdev
Transport in Nottingham